Remember Shakti – The Believer is a live album by the world fusion band Remember Shakti, that was released in 2000 on the Verve label. The live set features 
John McLaughlin on guitar, electric mandolinist U. Srinivas, Vikku Selvaganesh playing ghatam, and tabla player Zakir Hussain. The album peaked number 20 in the Billboard Top Jazz Albums chart.

Track listing
 "5 In The Morning, 6 In The Afternoon"(John McLaughlin) – 
 "Ma No Pa"(Zakir Hussain) – 
 "Lotus Feet"(McLaughlin) – 
 "Maya"(U. Srinivas) – 
 "Anna"(McLaughlin) – 
 "Finding The Way"(McLaughlin) –

Personnel
 U. Srinivas – electric mandolin
 Zakir Hussain – tabla
 John McLaughlin – guitar
 Vikku Selvaganesh – ghatam

Other credits
 Max Costa – mastering, mixing
 Steve Hoffman – engineer
 Sven Hoffman – engineer, mixing assistant
 John Newcott – release coordinator
 Christian Pégand – production coordination
 Holger Schwark – engineer
 Freddy Zerbib – management

Chart performance

References

2000 live albums
Live world music albums
Shakti (band) albums
Verve Records live albums